The Accademia Fiorentina was a philosophical and literary academy in Florence, Italy during the Renaissance.

History
The Accademia Fiorentina was founded in Florence on 1 November 1540 as the Accademia degli Umidi, or "academy of the wet ones", in contrast to or parody of the name of the recently founded Accademia degli Infiammati, or "academy of the burning ones", of Padova. The twelve founding members were Baccio Baccelli, Bartolomeo Benci, Pier Fabbrini, Paolo de Gei, Antonfrancesco Grazzini, Gismondo Martelli, Niccolò Martelli, Giovanni Mazzuoli, Cynthio d'Amelia Romano, Filippo Salvetti, Michelangelo Vivaldi and Simon della Volta. Within 15 months of its foundation, on 25 February 1541 more fiorentino (i.e. 25 February 1542), the academy changed its name to Accademia Fiorentina, in accordance with the wishes of Cosimo I de' Medici.

In 1783, by order of Grand Duke Pietro Leopoldo, the Accademia Fiorentina was merged with the Accademia degli Apatisti and the Accademia della Crusca, into the new Accademia Fiorentina Seconda.

Activities
The principal topic of discussion of the academy was the question of what should constitute the basis for the Italian language, which until about this time was not so called; rather, it was referred to as volgare, roughly "the common tongue". While the Infiammati supported the suggestions of Pietro Bembo and Giovan Giorgio Trissino that the language of Boccaccio and Petrarch should serve as a model for literary Italian, the Umidi believed it should be based on contemporary Florentine usage and on the language of Dante. Three of them, Giovambattista Gelli (1498–1563), Pierfrancesco Giambullari (1495–1555) and Carlo Lenzoni (1501–51), wrote treatises in support of this position.

References

Further reading
 Michel Plaisance (2004). L’Accademia e il suo Principe: cultura e politica a Firenze al tempo di Cosimo I e di Francesco de' Medici; L’Académie et le Prince: culture et politique à Florence au temps de Côme Ier et de François de Médicis Manziana: Vecchiarelli. (in French)
 Iacopo Rilli (1700). Notizie letterarie ed istoriche intorno agli uomini illustri dell'Accademia Fiorentina. Firenze: Piero Matini. (in Italian).
 Salvino Salvini (1717). Fasti consolari dell'Accademia fiorentina. Firenze: Nella Stamperia di S.A.R, per Gio. Gaetano Tartini e Santi Franchi. (in Italian).

1540 establishments in Italy
Philosophical schools and traditions
Renaissance philosophy
Learned societies of Italy